Crime is present in various forms in Cuba. Though the government does not release official crime statistics, Cuba is considered one of the safer countries in Latin America, with murder rates are below those of most Latin American countries. In 2016, Cuba had an intentional homicide rate of 4.99/100,000 inhabitants (572 intentional homicides), lower than the homicide rate in the United States.*

Though recently crime reports are on the rise, gun crime is virtually nonexistent, drug trafficking is illegal, and there is below-average crisis intervention from police. 

Drug trafficking grew dramatically in the mid-1980s and 1990s. In the 1990s over 200 foreigners and many more Cubans were caught smuggling drugs, and some 31 tons of drugs, mostly United States-bound, were seized by the authorities. Since, the authorities have spent significant time and ressources in curbing the drug trade industries.

Prostitution in Cuba is legal, but pornography is illegal.

History
19th century
Some of the laws, crimes, and punishments pertinent to Cuba were enumerated in an 1879 translation of an 1870s document, issued by Spain. The penalties for crimes were subclassified as corporal penalties (including execution by the garrote upon a scaffold), correctional penalties, light penalties, penalties common to the three preceding classes, and accessory penalties. Many crimes were described in the document, under various Titles and Articles:
 Crimes against the external security of the State (such as treason)
 Crimes against the constitution (such as Lèse-majesté)
 Crimes against public order (such as rebellion and sedition)
 Falsitites and falsifications (such as counterfeiting of money or documents)
 Violation of laws relating to interments, violation of sepulchers and offenses against the public health (such as adulterated medicines)
 Gambling and raffles (such as unauthorized lotteries)
 Offenses committed by public employees in the discharge of their office (such as bribery)
 Crimes against persons (such as dueling)
 Crimes against chastity (such as rape)
 Crimes against honor (such as calumny)
 Crimes against the civil status of persons (such as celebration of illegal marriages)
 Crimes against liberty and security (such as abduction of infants or abandonment of children)
 Crimes against property (such as robbery)
 Reckless negligence

20th century
During the 1900s Cuba was under a dictatorship and because of this negligent leader, Cuba was engulfed in poverty, crime, and corruption. This necessitated intervention by the then president to hold parleys with them and induct them into the Cuban police force. After some time, the criminal gangs from the US migrated to Cuba and took control of the casinos. However, as the US government wanted to have a hold on Cuba, they created a security force, a secret service agency which brought crime under control. However, when Cuba planned attack on USA, the situation changed and the police force ensured that the criminal elements were controlled in the country and many of them fled to the US as the immigration rules facilitated such migration.

Drug trafficking grew dramatically in the mid-1980s and 1990s. In the 1990s, over 200 foreigners and many more Cubans were caught smuggling drugs, and some 31 tons of drugs, mostly United States-bound, were seized by the authorities. The activity created a climate of fear of mistrust in Cuba, known as "desconfianza". Both the American and Cuban governments targeted issues such as migration, drug trafficking, and terrorism.

In the 1990s, a new form of Cuban literature, known as "Cuban Dirty Realism" by critics became popular, reflecting the "prisoners, prostitutes, drug users, alcoholics, thieves, and murderers whose lives involve lots of sex, drinking, drugs" in Cuba. Prostitution grew dramatically during this period, fueled by the increase in tourism in the country and legalization of dollars in 1992. Prostitution isn't illegal in Cuba, but is frowned on by many and is morally reprehensible and considered to be a "social disease" and a "product of pre-revolutionary society's selfish capitalist culture." The authorities in Cuba have organized various campaigns against it since the early Castro days, attempting to encourage women to seek more formal employment in factories and gain skills such as sewing. During the 1998 campaign, Cuban police patrolled areas such as Varadero Beach and the Cuban Keys, key tourist areas affected by it. According to reports though, prostitutes often offer bribes to enforcement officers.

Jineterismo

In Cuba, jineterismo is a category of illegal or semi-legal economic activities related to tourism in Cuba. It covers a broad range of activities including prostitution and pimping, as well as other forms of hustling, such as selling black-market and counterfeit goods, providing private taxi services and serving as informal tourist guides. The term can also be applied to those activities of professional white-collar workers that generate income from interaction with peers abroad. The word derives from the Spanish jinete ("horserider"). Jinetear, meaning "to jockey", refers to the competitive act of riding a horse for economic reward. A male practitioner is a jinetero, a female jinetera. The term jineterismo became widely used in the 1990s as a synonym for prostitution in Cuba, with prostitutes being referred to as jineteras. The United States Department of State defines jineteros as:

Corruption

Cuba has a moderate corruption rate. The 2012 Transparency International Corruption Perceptions Index ranked the country 58th out of 176 countries, tied with Jordan and Namibia. Cuba fared better than most of the other countries in the Caribbean and Central America. The government has made an effort to curb corruption, and a handful of corrupt individuals have been captured in recent years.

Penal codes
In criminal matters, the Penal Code has been in force in Cuba since 1879. The Law of Criminal Procedure has been in force since 1889. In 1900 correctional courts were created for minor offenses and crimes; such cases previously went to various Audiencias for consideration. Penalties included corporal and correctional. The use of the death penalty at the time was described as:
The penalty of death is executed by means of the instrument known as the "garrote." The execution takes place upon a board platform within the walls of the jail, in the day time, within twenty-four hours after notice of the sentence is given; it is held privately and in the presence of those persons who are required to be present and those who are authorized to witness it by the president of the court. The body of the felon remains exposed upon the gallows for four hours, and is then handed over to his relatives for burial, if they request it, and the burial must take place without any pomp. The death penalty will not be executed upon a woman who is pregnant, and she will not be notified of her sentence until forty days have elapsed after her delivery.

In 1889 the military governor of Cuba revoked some of the provisions of the Penal Code of Spain which had applied to Cuba. Some of the changes included that anyone who promoted or took part in any game of chance, except purely for recreation or pastime, should be subject to a fine; and that anyone who bribed a public officer with gifts, presents, offerings, or promises should receive the same punishment as the officer bribed, except for the deprivation of office.

20th century 
In 1926 Fernando Ortiz led a legal commission to replace the penal code from the era of Spanish regime. Modeled after Cesare Lombroso's work, Ortiz's had a nationalistic mission in which he developed a "scientific crusade against crime", emphasizing social rehabilitation instead of state retribution.

The country underwent radical change in the structure of its criminal law after 1959. Many common crimes were reclassified as political crimes. The death penalty was reinstated, and a new criminal offense, illicit enrichment, was created. The age of criminal responsibility was placed at sixteen years. In 1979 a new criminal code replaced the one created in 1936 (the 1936 Social Defense Code). It addressed several areas of crime, such as crime against: state security, administration of justice, public safety, public order, national economy, cultural patrimony, public trust, another person's life and health, individual rights, worker's rights, personal and family relations, minors and youth, and honor.

See also 
 Law enforcement in Cuba

References